The 1995 Nicholls State Colonels football team represented Nicholls State University as a member of the Southland Conference during the 1995 NCAA Division I-AA football season. Led by first-year head coach Darren Barbier, the Colonels compiled an overall record of 0–11 with mark of 0–5 in conference play, placing last out of six teams in the Southland. Nicholls State played home games at John L. Guidry Stadium in Thibodaux, Louisiana.

Schedule

References

Nicholls State
Nicholls Colonels football seasons
College football winless seasons
Nicholls State Colonels football